The 1973 Currie Cup was the 35th edition of the Currie Cup, the premier annual domestic rugby union competition in South Africa.

Results

Semi-finals

Final

See also

 Currie Cup

References

1973
1973 in South African rugby union
1973 rugby union tournaments for clubs